The Franklin child prostitution ring allegations began in June 1988 in Omaha, Nebraska and attracted significant public and political interest until late 1990, when separate state and federal grand juries concluded that the allegations were unfounded and the ring was a "carefully crafted hoax."

In 1988, authorities looked into allegedly baseless allegations that prominent citizens of Nebraska, as well as high-level U.S. politicians, were involved in a child prostitution ring.  Alleged abuse victims were interviewed, who claimed that children in foster care were flown to the East Coast of the United States to be sexually abused at "bad parties".  The claims primarily centered on Lawrence E. King Jr., who ran the now defunct Franklin Community Federal Credit Union in Omaha, Nebraska, and alleged that the ring was "a cult of devil worshipers involved in the mutilation, sacrifice and cannibalism of numerous children".  Numerous conspiracy theories evolved, claiming that the alleged abuse was part of a widespread series of crimes including devil worship, cannibalism, drug trafficking, and CIA arms dealing.

The Nebraska State Foster Care Review Board submitted the results of a two-year investigation into the alleged physical and sexual abuse of foster children to the executive board of the Nebraska Legislature, who were investigating reports of child sexual abuse linked to the credit union.  After investigation, a grand jury in Douglas County, where Omaha, Nebraska is situated, determined the abuse allegations were baseless, describing them as a "carefully crafted hoax" and indicting two of the original accusers on perjury charges. The grand jury suspected that the false stories originated from a fired employee of Boys Town, who might have "fueled the fire of rumor and innuendo" because of personal grudges.  A federal grand jury also concluded that the abuse allegations were unfounded and indicted 21-year-old Alisha Owen, an alleged victim, on eight counts of perjury.  Owen served  years in prison.  Separately, the federal grand jury indicted multiple officers of the credit union for embezzlement of funds, including King.

References

1988 crimes in the United States
1988 hoaxes
1988 in Nebraska
Child sexual abuse in the United States
Conspiracy theories in the United States
Crime in Omaha, Nebraska
False allegations of sex crimes
Hoaxes in the United States
Politics of Nebraska
Satanic ritual abuse hysteria in the United States